Thomas Chubbuck (February 22, 1820 – January 10, 1888) was an American copper and steel engraver and the designer of one of the earliest American gummed stamps, the "Brattleboro stamp", in 1846, as well as the engraver of the modern seal of Springfield, Massachusetts. While living in Boston, apprenticing as an engraver by profession and studying music as an amateur, he met Frederick N. Palmer, then a music teacher but future postmaster of the Brattleboro, Vermont post office. After the two had since-relocated to Brattleboro, Palmer would later ask Chubbuck to design a simple stamp for pre-paid postage in August 1846, which Chubbuck obliged "for the fun of the thing". Though a rarity, the Brattleboro stamp has been falsely described as the first postage stamp in the United States, Chubbuck modeled it after its preceding counterparts from Providence and the New York Postmaster's Provisional.

By the end of Chubbuck's life examples of such stamps were sold by collectors for as much as $200 (approximately $5761.51 in 2019 USD), and were sold for as much as $16,500 at auction in 2015. Chubbuck was also a prominent figure in Springfield's temperance community, paying for the fees and charter of the Western Massachusetts Sons of Temperance chapter in his final years leading up to his death.

References

Further reading

External links

 Chubbuck, Thomas (1820–1888), New Hampshire Historical Society

1820 births
1888 deaths
19th-century engravers
American stamp designers
American engravers
People from Brattleboro, Vermont
People from Boston
People from Springfield, Massachusetts
Massachusetts Prohibitionists
Sons of Temperance